Achi is a village in the Ozurgeti Municipality of Guria in western Georgia with the population of 36 (2014).

References

External links

Populated places in Ozurgeti Municipality